The following highways are numbered 776:

Canada
  Alberta Highway 776
  New Brunswick Route 776
 Saskatchewan Highway 776

United States
 Ohio State Route 776
 Puerto Rico Highway 776